Avanti! Avanti! is a German educational television series, broadcast on NDR in 1977. It is an Italian language course, covering two 13-episode sections.

See also
List of German television series

German educational television series
1977 German television series debuts
1977 German television series endings
Das Erste original programming
Italian-language education television programming
Italian-language television
Italian language